Ihor Mykhaylovych Kurylo (born 3 May 1993) is a Ukrainian professional footballer who plays as a defender for Metalist 1925 Kharkiv.

Club career
He began playing football at age 7. His first coach in the local sports school was Volodymyr Vasylchyshyn. Later he was invited to learn soccer skills for four years under the coach Vasiliy Matviykiv. At the same time he played in the Ukrainian Youth Football League for the team FC BRW-VIK Volodymyr-Volynskyi in Volodymyr.

After completing school he entered the Ternopil Volodymyr Hnatyuk National Pedagogical University, where there was a strong football team. After a while in 2011 he won a spot on the team, which won a regional championship, won a Super Cup and was a finalist of the Ukrainian Students' League.

In 2012, he began playing for FC Ternopil, which at the time was in the Ukrainian Second League. The team was promoted to the Ukrainian First League after finishing 3rd in the 2013–2014 season.

International career
He was the captain of Ukraine national student football team at the 2015 Summer Universiade in South Korea.

External links
 
 
 

1993 births
Living people
People from Zboriv
Ukrainian footballers
Association football defenders
Ukraine student international footballers
Ukraine youth international footballers
FC Ternopil players
FC Ahrobiznes Volochysk players
FC Metalist 1925 Kharkiv players
Ukrainian Premier League players
Ukrainian First League players
Ukrainian Second League players
Ukrainian Amateur Football Championship players
Sportspeople from Ternopil Oblast